Eutretosoma woodi is a species of tephritid or fruit flies in the genus Eutretosoma of the family Tephritidae.

Distribution
Malawi, South Africa.

References

Tephritinae
Insects described in 1924
Diptera of Africa